Gammarus stasiuki  is a species of freshwater amphipod crustacean found in Poland, Ukraine and Romania. It was named in honour of Polish writer Andrzej Stasiuk.

References

Crustaceans of Europe
Fauna of Poland
Fauna of Ukraine
Fauna of Romania
stasiuki